Orange County International Raceway was a combined -mile US dragstrip and 2-mile road course, plus a motocross track, located in Irvine, California adjacent to the Interstate 5 (I-5) Santa Ana Freeway. Under a lease agreement with the Irvine Company, OCIR – as it was known in racing circles – was in operation from August 5, 1967 until its closure on October 30, 1983.  The track was so named because its founders envisioned hosting sports car, motorcycle, midget, and stock car races in addition to National Hot Rod Association (NHRA) sanctioned drag racing events.

Known as 'The Supertrack', OCIR was designed to be the most modern of dragstrip facilities in the late 1960s, offering spectator comforts and conveniences never before available at a drag race facility in Southern California. The track construction included the extensive use of landscaping, permanent restrooms and concession stands, reserved seats with backs, drinking fountains installed throughout, the sport's first electric scoreboard and a 40-foot-high, four-story, glass-enclosed control tower and administration building.

The well-known Bob Bondurant School of High Performance Driving was founded at the track in 1968.

References

 The County, Tracing the Rise and Fall of Drag Racing's Original "Supertrack", Dave Wallace, Drag Racing Magazine, November 1984.
 Clock Runs Out On Orange County Raceway, Gary Jarlson, Los Angeles Times, October 29, 1983.
 The Last Drag Race, Shav Glick, Los Angeles Times, October 29, 1983.
 Orange County Drag Strip Opens Tonight, Los Angeles Times, August 5, 1967.

External links
 http://silverstone.fortunecity.com/bonneville/218/ocir01/
 http://ochistorical.blogspot.com/2009/02/orange-county-international-raceway.html
 http://www.nhra.com/blog/dragster-insider/2008/10/29/33661/
 http://www.nhra.com/blog/dragster-insider/2008/11/4/33868/
 http://www.competitionplus.com/2004_09_15/orange_county.html
 http://www.na-motorsports.com/Tracks/CA/OrangeCountyInternational.html
 http://www.northernthunder.com/lastsupertrack.html
 http://wikimapia.org/4772164/Former-site-of-Orange-County-International-Raceway

Defunct motorsport venues in the United States
Defunct drag racing venues
History of Orange County, California
History of Irvine, California
California
Sports venues completed in 1967
1967 establishments in California
1983 disestablishments in California